This is an incomplete list of newspapers published in the Central African Republic.

Newspapers 
 Be Afrika
 Centrafrique Presse
 Le Citoyen
 Le Confident
 Le Democrate
 E Le Songo
 Echo de Centrafrique

External links
 
 
 

  
Central African Republic
Newspapers